Pearl M. Hart (April 7, 1890 – March 22, 1975) was a Chicago attorney who defended oppressed minority groups. Hart was the first woman in Chicago to be appointed Public Defender in the Morals Court. She represented children, women, immigrants, lesbians, and gay men, often without fee or for a nominal fee. She attended the John Marshall Law School and was admitted to the Illinois State Bar in 1914.

Biography 

Pearl's family moved to Chicago in 1892 when her father, Rabbi David Harchovsky, accepted a rabbinical position supervising the kosher slaughtering of animals for a congregation on the southwest side.

She was admitted to the bar in 1914 and became one of the first female attorneys in Chicago to specialize in criminal law. She began her career as an adult probation officer in Municipal Court in 1915 and continued in that position until 1917.

In the 1950s, Hart focused on defending immigrants in deportation proceedings. In U.S. v. Witkovish, which she took to the United States Supreme Court, the high court agreed with her contention that the Attorney General's power to question aliens subject to deportation was limited by constitutional safeguards. She stated, "...I defend the foreign born against the present deportation hysteria because of a consciousness that it was the foreign born and their children who built this nation of ours and who have been its most loyal partisans".

In April 1981, to honor Hart and 1920's Chicago activist Henry Gerber, "The Midwest Gay and Lesbian Archive and Library" changed its name to "The Henry Gerber–Pearl M. Hart Library: The Midwest Lesbian & Gay Resource Center."

Called the "Guardian Angel of Chicago's Gay Community" for her diligent fight against police harassment, Hart was inducted posthumously into the Chicago Gay and Lesbian Hall of Fame in 1992.

References

Illinois lawyers
1890 births
1975 deaths
Public defenders
People from Traverse City, Michigan
Lawyers from Chicago
20th-century American lawyers
John Marshall Law School (Chicago) alumni
American LGBT rights activists
LGBT lawyers
LGBT people from Michigan
LGBT people from Illinois
Activists from Illinois
20th-century American women lawyers
20th-century American LGBT people
Inductees of the Chicago LGBT Hall of Fame